is a 1990 Japanese film directed by Jun Ichikawa, and based on the novel Goodbye Tsugumi by Banana Yoshimoto.

Awards
12th Yokohama Film Festival
 Best Supporting Actress - Tomoko Nakajima
 6th Best Film

Cast
Riho Makise
Tomoko Nakajima
Yasuyo Shiratori

References

External links 
 

1990 films
Films based on Japanese novels
Films directed by Jun Ichikawa
1990s Japanese films